Tayfun Devrimol (born 22 April 1980 in Turkey) is a Turkish-born Australian former footballer who last played for Mounties Wanderers in his home country.

Malaysia
Devrimol was suspended for his team's first round of the 2004 Malaysia Cup and was dropped after spitting at coach Raul Carrizo following a 3–2 victory over Perlis FA, getting fined 3000 Australian dollars for his repugnant behavior.

Fiji
Was one of three Australians in Nadroga for the 2008 Fiji Inter-District Championship.

Futsal
The Australian represented the Australia national futsal team at the 2002 FIFA Beach Soccer World Cup, making two appearances and scoring zero goals.

References

External links 
 Bankstown City SportsTG Profile 
 National Premier Leagues SportsTG Profile

Association football forwards
Association football defenders
1980 births
Australian people of Turkish descent 
Australian expatriate soccer players
Expatriate footballers in Malaysia
Johor Darul Ta'zim F.C. players
Expatriate footballers in Fiji
Bonnyrigg White Eagles FC players
Preston Lions FC players
Turkish emigrants to Australia
Living people
Australian soccer players
Malaysia Premier League players
Australian expatriate sportspeople in Malaysia
Nadroga F.C. players
Sydney Olympic FC players
Blacktown City FC players
Mounties Wanderers FC players